Klein Point is a headland in the Australian state of South Australia located about  south of Stansbury in the locality of Wool Bay on Yorke Peninsula.  It is the site of a port facility established to handle shipments of limestone for Adelaide Brighton Cement.  The port is managed by Flinders Ports.  Prior to 1965 it was known as Farquhar Jetty.

History 
The jetty was built in 1920 by the South Australian Harbors Board on a lease back agreement. It was widened to 1927, and altered again in 1953. In 1965 a T section was added to improved loading facilities.

Beaches 
Beaches lie on either side of Klein Point, with the mine operations, stockpile, breakwater and jetty located between the two small beaches. The northern beach is 100 m long and hemmed in between the bluffs and the jetty seawall and backed by the mine operations.  Both beaches are unsuitable for recreational activities due to access difficulties and the mining operations.

Limestone 
About  of limestone are shipped across Gulf St Vincent each year.  Currently Accolade II is used to ship the limestone across the gulf to the Port Adelaide terminal.

References 

Yorke Peninsula
Gulf St Vincent
Headlands of South Australia
Ports and harbours of South Australia
Mining in South Australia